Edward Mazula (born March 21, 1990) is a professional ice hockey forward currently playing for the HC Arystan. He was a member of the Kazakhstan men's national junior ice hockey team at the 2009 World Junior Ice Hockey Championships as well as at the 2010 World Junior Ice Hockey Championships.

References

Living people
1990 births
Sportspeople from Karaganda
Kazakhstani ice hockey forwards
Universiade medalists in ice hockey
Universiade silver medalists for Kazakhstan
Competitors at the 2011 Winter Universiade
Competitors at the 2015 Winter Universiade
21st-century Kazakhstani people